Kearney or Kearneys may refer to:

Places

Australia
 Kearneys Falls, Queensland
 Kearneys Spring, Queensland

Canada
 Kearney, Ontario
 Kearney Lake, Nova Scotia

Northern Ireland
 Kearney, County Down, a townland in County Down

United States
 Kearney, Missouri
 Kearney, Nebraska
 Kearney, New Jersey
 Kearney, North Carolina
 Kearney County, Nebraska
 Kearney Park, Mississippi
 Kearney Township (disambiguation)

Companies
 Kearney (consulting firm), management consulting firm
 Kearney and Black Hills Railway, a short line railroad between Kearney and Callaway, Nebraska
 Kearney & Company, American accounting firm

Other uses
 Kearney (surname)
 Kearney Air Force Base
 Kearney Research and Extension Center, an agricultural research station in the University of California system
 Kearney Zzyzwicz, a fictional character from The Simpsons

See also
 Kearny (disambiguation)
 Kearneysville